Kankamogre-Peulh is a small town in the Bittou Department of Boulgou Province in south-eastern Burkina Faso. As of 2005, the town has a population of 960.

It is located near Kankamogre, and the appended French ethnonym Peuhl (Fula or Fulani) would indicate that its population was or is mainly Fula people.

References

Populated places in the Centre-Est Region
Boulgou Province